The 62nd Red Banner Rocket Division is a formation of the 33rd Guards Rocket Army, Russian Strategic Rocket Forces, which is located near Uzhur, in Krasnoyarsk Krai.

This division deployed in the base of an operational group formed by the directive of the General Staff of the Strategic Rocket Forces 24 in July 1964. Colonel Vasilii Trofimovich Kuts  was entrusted with the group's formation. On 12 June 1964, the unit was handed its battle flag, and on 8 September 1964, Colonel Pyotr Mikhailovich Prikhodko, arrived and assumed his duties as the first divisional commander. In November 1964, the first military builders arrived.

Equipment 
The division is equipped with the stationary type R-36M, R-36UTTH, and R-36M2 intercontinental ballistic missiles. These weapons have the NATO classification SS-18.

References 
«A. L. Конарев» Omskaya policy years 1959–1999. - Omsk.: Omskaya Printing House, 1999. S. 77

External links 
Michael Holm, [www.ww2.dk/new/rvsn/62md.htm 62nd Missile Division]

Rocket divisions of the Soviet Union
Rocket divisions of Russia
Military units and formations established in 1964
Wikipedia articles needing cleanup after translation from Russian